Plitidepsin (also known as dehydrodidemnin B, marketed by PharmaMar, S.A. under the trade name Aplidin) is a chemical compound extracted from the ascidian Aplidium albicans. It is currently undergoing clinical trial testing.  It is a member of the class of compounds known as didemnins.

Chemical structure
Plitidepsin is a cyclic depsipeptide, meaning it is a cyclic peptide in which there is one or more ester bond in place of one or more of a peptide bond. Its chemical structure is very close to that of didemnin B, the only difference being that the lactate residue in didemnin B is present in the oxidized pyruvate version.

Pharmacological activity
Like all didemnin compounds, plitidepsin exhibits antitumor, antiviral and immunosuppressive activities. It shows promise in shrinking tumors in pancreatic, stomach, bladder, and prostate cancers.

Plitidepsin inhibits the human protein eEF1A which has potential interactions with multiple coronavirus proteins. Plitidepsin possesses antiviral activity against SARS-CoV-2 in vitro and in an in vivo mouse model.

Marketing authorisation status

European Union
In July 2003, plitidepsin was granted orphan drug status by the European Medicines Agency for treating acute lymphoblastic leukemia. On 14 December 2017, EMA´s Committee for Medicinal Products for Human Use adopted a negative opinion, recommending the refusal of the marketing authorisation for the treatment of multiple myeloma. PharmaMar requested a re-examination of the initial opinion. After a re-examination of the opinion, the refusal of the marketing authorisation was confirmed on 22 March 2018. The CHMP was of the opinion that the benefits of Aplidin did not outweigh its risks. Improvement in overall survival was not sufficiently demonstrated, and severe side effects were reported more frequently with the combination of Aplidin and dexamethasone than with dexamethasone alone. On 1 October 2018, PharmaMar appealed against this decision, alleging a lack of impartiality on the part of certain members of the Scientific Advisory Group that had advised the CHMP. On 28 October 2020, the General Court upheld PharmaMar's appeal and annulled the decision refusing marketing authorisation for Aplidin, and the European Commission then returned the application for Aplidin to the EMA.

Australia
In Australia plitidepsin was approved in December 2018, in combination with dexamethasone, for the treatment of patients with relapsed and refractory multiple myeloma who have received at least three prior treatment regimens, including both a proteasome inhibitor and an immunomodulator. It may be used after two prior lines of therapy if refractory and/or intolerant to both a proteasome inhibitor and an immunomodulator.

Clinical trials
As of 2007, it was undergoing multicenter phase II clinical trials.

In 2016, early results in a small phase I trial for multiple myeloma were announced.

References 

Depsipeptides
Experimental cancer drugs